The 1997 VisionAire 500 was the eighth round of the 1996–1997 Indy Racing League. The race was held on July 26, 1997, at the  Charlotte Motor Speedway in Concord, North Carolina, USA. The event was the first Indy Racing League event to be held at Charlotte.

Media coverage
Although the event was run in July 26, the race was not broadcast live. Instead, CBS carried it on a one-day tape delay as part of its sports anthology series, which was known at the time as The CBS Sports Show.

Mike Joy was the lap-by-lap commentator. Scott Sharp, who at the time was nursing injuries that were preventing him from driving, was the analyst in the booth. Brian Hammons and Mike King reported from the pits.

Qualifying

  Failed to qualify after breaking a cam sensor in practice, but was allowed to start the race at the back of the field.

Failed to qualify or withdrew 
 Buzz Calkins for Bradley Motorsports - suffered a concussion during testing on July 8 on New Hampshire and was unable to compete.
 Robbie Buhl for Team Menard - entered for the race, but was still recovering from a concussion suffered during testing on June 4.
 Jeff Ward R for Team Cheever - withdrew prior to the start of practice.

Race recap

Buddy Lazier beat rookie Billy Boat to take his second IRL victory in the first-ever Indy car race at this long-time stock-car racing venue. The race was dominated by Tony Stewart at the beginning, but his car developed handling problems after pitting during a caution period on lap 75 and was out of contention thereafter. Lazier stayed out during the caution and assumed the lead, but had to make a green-flag stop on lap 93 and fell a lap down.

Mark Dismore moved up steadily through the field but blew an engine at full speed going down the front stretch on lap 99; he spun the car harmlessly into the infield in turn 1. Boat, Roberto Guerrero and Jimmy Kite (in only his second IRL start) swapped the lead until Guerrero touched wheels with points leader Davey Hamilton in turn 2 and both cars spun into the wall. Neither driver was hurt, but his resulting 16th-place finish cost Hamilton the points lead. Lazier unlapped himself on the subsequent caution and joined the duel with Boat and Kite; the latter's race ended when his car pushed up into the wall exiting turn 4.

After the caution, Lazier took the lead and tried to pull away from Boat, but got caught behind Scott Goodyear who was trying to stay on the lead lap. While Lazier made several high-risk pass attempts (including two runs through the grass in the quad-oval), Boat caught him and briefly assumed the lead, but then Goodyear conceded and Lazier moved back in front for the final 11 laps. In the last few laps, Kenny Bräck and Eddie Cheever staged a furious duel for fifth as they picked through traffic, with Bräck coming out on top.

Box score

Race Statistics
Lead changes: 13 among 6 drivers

Standings after the race
Drivers' Championship standings

 Note: Only the top five positions are included for the standings.

References

External links
IndyCar official website

1996–97 in IndyCar
1997 in sports in North Carolina